Borhani, is a traditional yogurt-like drink from Bangladesh. Borhani is made from sour doi, green chilli, mustard seeds, black salt, coriander and mint. It is considered by some to be a type of lassi. It is very commonly consumed in Dhaka and Chittagong regions of Bangladesh, where it is drunk in special events such as weddings and iftar gatherings in Ramadan. It is normally drank after heavy meals such as biryani (Kacchhi) and polao and morog Polao  in order to aid digestion although appetizer borhanis do exist.

Etymology
The origin of the naming of the drink is unknown. However, the word is most likely to have come from Arabic Burhan, meaning "proof".

Alternatively, it could have been derived from the Persian term Borani (Persian: بورانی), which denotes a dish made of yogurt and greens.

See also
Chaas

References

Bangladeshi cuisine
Bangladeshi drinks
Yogurt-based drinks